The Lance Grenades de 50 mm modèle 37 was a French light infantry mortar designed and produced shortly before the Second World War.

Design
The modèle 37 was issued during 1939 to replace rifle grenades in infantry platoons.  It was a simple weapon with a fixed elevation of 45°, with the range being set by twisting a ring on the base which varied the diameter of gas vents on the tube.  It consisted of a tube, baseplate and bipod. Although light and mobile it was short ranged and fired a small projectile. 

After testing in 1937 an initial order for 21,950 mortars was placed in January 1938.  This order was later changed to 50,000 mortars at the outbreak of war with all mortars to be completed by January 1941.  However, only 2,900 had been produced by June 1940 and few had been put into service due to a shortage of ammunition.  Production ceased after the French surrender in 1940 and wasn't resumed until 1944.  Those mortars captured by the Germans were given the designation Granatwerfer 203(f) and issued to occupation troops. The modèle 37 remained in the French inventory until the end of the First Indochina War when it was retired.

Ammunition conversions
After the French defeat the Germans converted modèle 37 ammunition to serve as sub-munitions for their AB 70-D1 cluster bombs.  The ammunition was given a new tail fin and these sub-munitions were given the German classification SD 1 FRZ.  Another German conversion was the Behelfsmine W-1 which consisted of removing the nose fuze and tail fins then adding a Buck chemical crush fuze to the projectile and using it either as a small anti-personnel mine or as a booby trap.

See also 

 Video on this mortar

Notes

World War II infantry mortars of France
50 mm artillery
Military equipment introduced in the 1930s